Wellston High School (WHS) is a public high school in Wellston, Ohio.  It is the only high school in the Wellston City School District.  The school's nickname is the Golden Rockets and the school's official colors are blue and gold.

Notable alumni
 Pete Abele, politician
 John Carey, Director of the Governor's Office of Appalachia, former Chancellor of the Ohio Board of Regents
 Lauren Kelsey Hall, 2004 Miss Ohio USA
 Jeff Montgomery, former MLB baseball player for the Cincinnati Reds and the Kansas City Royals

Athletics

The Golden Rockets belong to the Ohio High School Athletic Association (OHSAA) and the Tri-Valley Conference, a 16-member athletic conference located in southeastern Ohio.  The conference is divided into two divisions based on school size.  The Ohio Division features the larger schools, including Wellston, and the Hocking Division features the smaller schools.

See also
 Ohio High School Athletic Conferences

References

External links
 District website

High schools in Jackson County, Ohio
Public high schools in Ohio